Mesobiotus is a genus of tardigrades belonging to the family Macrobiotidae.

Species 
According to the 42nd edition of Actual checklist of Tardigrada species, the genus contains the following species:
 Mesobiotus altitudinalis (Biserov, 1997-1998)
 Mesobiotus anastasiae (Tumanov, 2020)
 Mesobiotus aradasi (Binda, Pilato & Lisi, 2005)
 Mesobiotus arguei (Pilato & Sperlinga, 1975)
 Mesobiotus armatus (Pilato & Binda, 1996)
 Mesobiotus australis (Pilato & D'Urso, 1976)
 Mesobiotus baltatus (McInnes, 1991)
 Mesobiotus barabanovi (Tumanov, 2005)
 Mesobiotus barbarae (Kaczmarek, Michalczyk & Degma, 2007)
 Mesobiotus binieki (Kaczmarek, Gołdyn, Prokop & Michalczyk, 2011)
 Mesobiotus blocki (Dastych, 1984)
 Mesobiotus contii (Pilato & Lisi, 2006)
 Mesobiotus coronatus (de Barros, 1942)
 Mesobiotus creber (Pilato & Lisi, 2009)
 Mesobiotus datanlanicus (Stec, 2019)
 Mesobiotus diegoi (Stec, 2022)
 Mesobiotus diffusus (Binda & Pilato, 1987)
 Mesobiotus diguensis (Pilato & Lisi, 2009)
 Mesobiotus dilimanensis (Itang, Stec, Mapalo, Mirano-Bascos & Michalczyk, 2020)
 Mesobiotus dimentmani (Pilato, Lisi & Binda, 2010)
 Mesobiotus divergens (Binda, Pilato & Lisi, 2005)
 Mesobiotus emiliae (Massa, Guidetti, Cesari, Rebecchi & Jönsson, 2021)
 Mesobiotus erminiae (Binda & Pilato, 1999)
 Mesobiotus ethiopicus (Stec & Kristensen, 2017)
 Mesobiotus fiedleri (Kaczmarek, Bartylak, Stec, Kulpa, M. Kepel, A. Kepel & Roszkowska, 2020)
 Mesobiotus furciger (Murray, 1907)
 Mesobiotus harmsworthi (Murray, 1907)
 Mesobiotus helenae (Tumanov & Pilato, 2019)
 Mesobiotus hieronimi (Pilato & Claxton, 1988)
 Mesobiotus hilariae (Vecchi, Cesari, Bertolani, Jönsson, Rebecchi & Guidetti, 2016)
 Mesobiotus imperialis (Stec, 2021)
 Mesobiotus insanis (Mapalo, Stec, Mirano-Bascos & Michalczyk, 2017)
 Mesobiotus insuetus (Pilato, Sabella & Lisi, 2014)
 Mesobiotus joenssoni (Guidetti, Gneuss, Cesari, Altiero & Schill, 2020)
 Mesobiotus kovalevi (Tumanov, 2004)
 Mesobiotus krynauwi (Dastych & Harris, 1995)
 Mesobiotus liviae (Ramazzotti, 1962)
 Mesobiotus lusitanicus (Maucci & Durante Pasa, 1984)
 Mesobiotus maklowiczi (Stec 2022)
 Mesobiotus marmoreus (Stec, 2021)
 Mesobiotus mauccii (Pilato, 1974)
 Mesobiotus meridionalis (Richters, 1909)
 Mesobiotus montanus (Murray, 1910)
 Mesobiotus mottai (Binda & Pilato, 1994)
 Mesobiotus neuquensis (Rossi, Claps & Ardohain, 2009)
 Mesobiotus nikolaevae (Tumanov, 2018)
 Mesobiotus nuragicus (Pilato & Sperlinga, 1975)
 Mesobiotus occultatus (Kaczmarek, Zawierucha, Buda, Stec, Gawlak, Michalczyk & Roszkowska, 2018)
 Mesobiotus orcadensis (Murray, 1907)
 Mesobiotus ovostriatus (Pilato & Patanè, 1998)
 Mesobiotus patiens (Pilato, Binda, Napolitano & Moncada, 2000)
 Mesobiotus perfidus (Pilato & Lisi, 2009)
 Mesobiotus peterseni (Maucci, 1991)
 Mesobiotus philippinicus (Mapalo, Stec, Mirano-Bascos & Michalczyk, 2016)
 Mesobiotus pilatoi (Binda & Rebecchi, 1992)
 Mesobiotus polaris (Murray, 1910)
 Mesobiotus pseudoblocki (Roszkowska, Stec, Ciobanu & Kaczmarek, 2016)
 Mesobiotus pseudocoronatus (Pilato, Binda & Lisi, 2006)
 Mesobiotus pseudoliviae (Pilato & Binda, 1996)
 Mesobiotus pseudonuragicus (Pilato, Binda & Lisi, 2004)
 Mesobiotus pseudopatiens (Kaczmarek & Roszkowska, 2016)
 Mesobiotus radiatus (Pilato, Binda & Catanzaro, 1991)
 Mesobiotus reinhardti (Michalczyk & Kaczmarek, 2003)
 Mesobiotus rigidus (Pilato & Lisi, 2006)
 Mesobiotus romani (Roszkowska, Stec, Gawlak & Kaczmarek, 2018)
 Mesobiotus siamensis (Tumanov, 2006)
 Mesobiotus sicheli (Binda, Pilato & Lisi, 2005)
 Mesobiotus simulans (Pilato, Binda, Napolitano & Moncada, 2000)
 Mesobiotus skorackii (Kaczmarek, Zawierucha, Buda, Stec, Gawlak, Michalczyk & Roszkowska, 2018)
 Mesobiotus snaresensis (Horning, Schuster & Grigarick, 1978)
 Mesobiotus stellaris (du Bois-Reymond Marcus, 1944)
 Mesobiotus szeptyckii (Kaczmarek & Michalczyk, 2009)
 Mesobiotus tehuelchensis (Rossi, Claps & Ardohain, 2009)
 Mesobiotus wuzhishanensis (Yin, Wang & Li, 2011)
 Mesobiotus zhejiangensis (Yin, Wang & Li, 2011)

Original publication 
 Vecchi, Cesari, Bertolani, Jönsson, Rebecchi & Guidetti, 2016 : Integrative systematic studies on tardigrades from Antarctica identify new genera and new species within Macrobiotoidea and Echiniscoidea. Invertebrate Systematics, .

References 

Tardigrade genera
Parachaela